Brook Street Rowing Club is a community rowing and social club located in Cuckfield.

History
Brook Street Rowing Club is Cuckfield's oldest and most traditional rowing club. It was founded in either 1840 or 1841, its minutes and membership record run continuously back to 1850. Records before this date have been lost. The club's committee meet (and have always met) at The Ship (a Public House in Whitemans Green, Cuckfield).  Although the Club no longer owns any boats, members enjoy all of the social and gastronomic advantages of its more physically active sister clubs locally.

It was on Whitemans Green that Gideon Mantell, the renowned English geologist and palaeontologist found his most famous fossils and it widely believed that he was a Founder Member of the club.

Notable members
Gideon Mantell

References

 
 Cuckfield European Association Newsletter, Issue 29, March 2010

External links
Cuckfield Town Website

Rowing clubs in England
Sport in West Sussex